Muya is a commune of the city of Mbuji-Mayi in the Democratic Republic of the Congo.

Mbuji-Mayi
Democratic Republic of Congo geography articles needing translation from French Wikipedia
Communes of the Democratic Republic of the Congo